Sredanci is a village in the Donji Andrijevci municipality of the Brod-Posavina County in Croatia. According to the 2011 census, it has a population of 322.

The village is most notable for eponymous motorway interchange of the A3 and A5 motorways, located to the southeast of the village.

References

Populated places in Brod-Posavina County